Tahibacter caeni is a Gram-negative, aerobic, non-spore-formin, rod-shaped and non-motile bacterium from the genus of Tahibacter which has been isolated from activated sludge from a wastewater treatment facility.

References

Xanthomonadales
Bacteria described in 2015